Aleksandr Nikolaevich Garkavets (October 19, 1947-) is a Soviet, Ukrainian, and Kazakhstani linguist, philologist, and Turkologist. He is best known for his work on the Kipchak languages, both modern and historical. Much of the focus of his work has been on the Armeno-Kipchak language, Cuman language, Crimean Tatar language, and Urum language.

Biography 
Garkavets was born on October 19, 1947, in the village of Svitlyi Luch, in the Starobesheve Raion, of Donetsk Oblast in the Ukrainian Soviet Socialist Republic.

Garkavets studied at the National University of Kharkiv in the department of Ukrainian language and literature, graduating in 1970. After graduation, he worked at the newspaper Sotsialistychna Kharkivshchyna and then at the National University of Kharkiv press. He entered graduate school in 1972 at the Institute of Oriental Studies of the Russian Academy of Sciences and the Institute of Linguistics of the Russian Academy of Sciences. In 1975 he defended his PhD dissertation on Kipchak monuments written in the Armenian script in Kamianets-Podilskyi. In 1987, he received a Doctor of Philology in Turkic languages for his work on Armeno-Kipchak and Urum materials.

In 1989, the Crimean Tatars were permitted to return their homeland. In preparation for their return, Garkavets prepared a number of manuals on the Crimean Tatar language, as well as a Crimean Tatar-Russian dictionary, at the request of the Ministry of Education and Science of Ukraine.

From 1988 onward, Garkevets worked primarily in the Kazakh Soviet Socialist Republic, later Kazakhstan. From 1988 to 1992 he served as the chair of the Department of Russian Language and Sociolinguistics at the Institute of Linguistics at the Kazakhstan Academy of Sciences. In 1989 he founded the Almaty Ukrainian Cultural Center.

From 2000 onward, Garkavets has worked as the director of Center of Eurasian Studies "Desht-i Qypchaq", a Kazakhstan-based organization that promotes the study of Kipchak languages with the support of the UNESCO Almaty Cluster Office.

Awards and honors 

 1988 - Award for Excellence in Education from the Ukrainian SSR
 1989 - 
 1997 - Laureate, Kazakh Presidential Prize for Peace and Spiritual Harmony
 2003 - Recipient of the 
 2006 - Award for merits in the development of science in Kazakhstan
 2010 - Badge of honor from the Turkish Language Association
 2017 - Recipient of a scholarship awarded by the President of Kazakhstan
 2021 - Recipient of the "Service to the Turkish Language Award" from the Turkish Language Association

Selected works

References

External links 
 
 Center of Eurasian Studies "Desht-i Qypchaq"

1947 births
Ukrainian scholars
National University of Kharkiv alumni
Turkologists
Living people